The Lakkia language, also spelled Lakkja, is a Kra–Dai language spoken in Jinxiu Yao Autonomous County, Laibin, East-Central Guangxi, China.

Lakkia speakers are thought to have migrated from further east, possibly from the Biao-speaking areas of Northwestern Guangdong Province (L.-Thongkum 1992). Today, they live mostly in the Dayaoshan region of Jinxiu County.

Names
Lakkia people are also known as the Cháshān Yáo 茶山瑶, meaning "Tea Mountain Yao", since they were traditionally considered by neighboring peoples to be ethnic Yao people. The name Lakkia is an autonym (self-designated name) that means "mountain people". All Lakkia dialects have 5 tones.

Classification
There is currently no consensus on the classification of Lakkia within the Kra–Dai family. Solnit (1988) and Hansell (1988) classify Lakkia as a sister of the Kam–Sui branch. Additionally, Solnit (1988) classifies Biao and Lakkia together as part of a Biao-Lakkia branch that is coordinate to Kam-Sui. However, L.-Thongkum (1992) considers Lakkia to be most closely related to the Tai branch, based on the large number of shared lexical items.

Dialects
Dialects of Lakkia include (L.-Thongkum 1992):
Jintian 金田
Liula 六拉
Jinxiu 金秀
Lingzu 岭祖
Changdong 长峒

The Lingzu dialect still preserves /kl-/ initial clusters, which corresponds to /kj-/ in most other dialects (L.-Thongkum 1992). Additionally, Changdong 长洞 and Jintian 金田 tone  (51) corresponds to Jinxiu 金秀 tone  (231). Also, L.-Thongkum (1992) reports that Jintian 金田 is a less conservative dialect.

Classification of Lakkia dialects by Norquest (2021):
Lakkja
Western
Jintian 金田
Eastern
Liula 六拉
Jinxiu 金秀

Distribution
Lakkia is spoken in the following locations.

Jinxiu Township 金秀镇: Jinxiu 金秀, Baisha 白沙, Liula 六拉, Xidi 昔地, Changtan 长滩, Chang'er 长二, Zhaibao 寨保, Yangliu 杨柳, Liuduan 六段, Jiangjun 将军, Sanpian 三片, Tiancun 田村, Liucun 刘村, Shecun 社村, Mengcun 孟村, Meicun 美村, Jincun 金村, Jintian 金田, Luomeng 罗梦
Changdong Township 长洞乡: Changdong 长洞, Gufang 古放, Pingdao 平道, Daojiang 道江, Dishui 滴水, Rongdong 容洞
Sanjiao Township 三角乡: Liuding 六定
Zhongliang Township 忠良乡: Lingzu 岭祖, Bale 巴勒
Luoxiang Township 罗香乡: Pingzhu 平竹

Lexical isoglosses
Some Biao-Lakkja lexical isoglosses as proposed by Norquest (2021):

See also
List of Proto-Lakkia reconstructions (Wiktionary)

Notes

References
 Theraphan L.-Thongkum. 1992. "A Preliminary Reconstruction of Proto-Lakkja (Cha Shan Yao)." In The Mon–Khmer Studies Journal, 20: 57-90.

Further reading
 
 Hansell, Mark. 1988. The Relation of Be to Tai: Evidence from Tones and Initials. In Comparative Kadai: Linguistic studies beyond Tai. Edited by Jerold A. Edmondson and David B. Solnit. Summer Institute of Linguistics and The University of Texas at Arlington Publications in Linguistics No. 86: 239-288.
 Haudricourt, André-G. 1967. "La langue lakkia." Bulletin de l'École Française d'Extrême-Orient 57 / Bulletin de la Société Linguistique de de Paris 62:1:165-182.
 Lan Qingyuan 蓝庆元. 2011. Lajiayu yanjiu 拉珈语研究. Nanning: Guangxi Normal University Press 广西师范大学出版社.
 Solnit, David B. 1988. "The position of Lakkia within Kadai." In Comparative Kadai: Linguistic studies beyond Tai, Jerold A. Edmondson and David B. Solnit (eds.). pages 219-238. Summer Institute of Linguistics Publications in Linguistics 86. Dallas: Summer Institute of Linguistics and the University of Texas at Arlington.
 Su Defu [苏德富], et al. 1992. Chashan Yao yanjiu wenji 茶山瑤研究文集. Beijing: Minzu University: 中央民族学院出版社.

External links
 ABVD: Proto-Lakkja word list
 ABVD: Lakkja (Jinxiu) word list

Languages of China
Kra–Dai languages
Guangxi